Band Sar Chukat (also Romanized as Band Sar Chūkāt; also known as Zavast Moḩammad and Band Sar) is a village in Polan Rural District, Polan District, Chabahar County, Sistan and Baluchestan Province, Iran. At the 2006 census, its population was 708, in 171 families.

References 

Populated places in Chabahar County